Jack Parker Payne (born 15 October 1999) is an Australian rules footballer who plays for the  in the Australian Football League (AFL).

Early life
Payne played junior football for Noosa AFC. Payne attended school at St Andrews Anglican College in Sunshine Coast, Queensland. At the age of 13, Payne was selected to join the Brisbane Lions's academy after a talent scout caught notice of him playing school football. He was also originally a promising discus thrower, representing Australia at the Oceanic Games. However, at the age of 17 he gave up this opportunity to pursue a life in the AFL instead. In 2017, Payne represented the Allies in the AFL Under 18 Championships, where he played 2 games and averaged 9.5 disposals per match.

AFL career
Payne played 18 games for the Brisbane Lions in the North East Australian Football League (NEAFL) in 2019, but was unable to break into the side. On debut, Payne collected 9 disposals, took 5 marks and spent 80% of the game on the ground.

Statistics
Updated to the end of the 2022 season.

|-
| 2018 ||  || 40
| 0 || — || — || — || — || — || — || — || — || — || — || — || — || — || —
|-
| 2019 ||  || 40
| 0 || — || — || — || — || — || — || — || — || — || — || — || — || — || —
|-
| 2020 ||  || 40
| 5 || 0 || 0 || 28 || 11 || 39 || 20 || 4 || 0.0 || 0.0 || 5.6 || 2.2 || 7.8 || 4.0 || 0.8
|-
| 2021 ||  || 40
| 10 || 0 || 0 || 73 || 46 || 119 || 49 || 16 || 0.0 || 0.0 || 7.3 || 4.6 || 11.9 || 4.9 || 1.6
|-
| 2022 ||  || 40
| 12 || 2 || 3 || 104 || 28 || 132 || 65 || 21 || 0.2 || 0.3 || 8.7 || 2.3 || 11.0 || 5.4 || 1.8
|- class=sortbottom
! colspan=3 | Career
! 27 !! 2 !! 3 !! 205 !! 85 !! 290 !! 134 !! 41 !! 0.1 !! 0.1 !! 7.6 !! 3.1 !! 10.7 !! 5.0 !! 1.5
|}

References

External links
 
 
 

1999 births
Living people
Sportspeople from the Sunshine Coast
Australian rules footballers from Queensland
Brisbane Lions players